Alcalalí (Spanish and ) is a Valencian municipality in the comarca of Marina Alta, province of Alicante, Spain.

It is situated in the Pop Valley (Vall de Pop) between the Serra del Ferrer and the mounts of Segili. It is bordered by Pedreguer and Benidoleig to the north, Jalón and Llíber to the east; Orba, Murla, Benigembla  and Parcent to the west and Tàrbena to the south.

References

External links 

Índice Estadístico Municipal de Alcalalí. Unidad de Documentación de la Diputación de Alicante 
Alcalalí en el Registro de Entidades Locales de la Generalidad Valenciana 

Municipalities in the Province of Alicante
Marina Alta